Manuela Maleeva and Tom Gullikson were the defending champions but lost in the second round to Kathleen Horvath and Leif Shiras.

Martina Navratilova and Heinz Günthardt won in the final 6–3, 6–4 against Elizabeth Smylie and John Fitzgerald.

Seeds
Champion seeds are indicated in bold text while text in italics indicates the round in which those seeds were eliminated.

Draw

Final

Top half

Bottom half

References
1985 US Open – Doubles draws and results at the International Tennis Federation

Mixed Doubles
US Open (tennis) by year – Mixed doubles